Wenzhou South railway station is a railway station located in Ouhai District, Wenzhou, Zhejiang Province, China, on the Wenzhou–Fuzhou railway, Ningbo–Taizhou–Wenzhou railway, and Jinhua–Wenzhou high-speed railway which are operated by China Railway Shanghai Group, China Railway Corporation.

History
Construction of the station began in October 2008. It opened on September 28, 2009.

Metro station
Line S1 of Wenzhou Rail Transit opened on January 23, 2019.

See also
Wenzhou railway station
Wenzhou North railway station

References

Railway stations in Zhejiang
Railway stations in China opened in 2009
Transport in Wenzhou
Buildings and structures in Wenzhou